List by constituency of the 217 members of the second Tunisian National Constituent Assembly elected in 2011.

List 

List
Constituent Assembly